Diede de Groot defeated Yui Kamiji in the final, 7–5, 6–4 to win the women's wheelchair tennis title at the 2017 Wheelchair Tennis Masters.

Jiske Griffioen was the two-time reigning champion, but retired from professional wheelchair tennis in October 2017.

Seeds

  Yui Kamiji (final)
  Diede de Groot (champion)
  Sabine Ellerbrock (round robin)
  Marjolein Buis (semifinals, fourth place)
  Aniek van Koot (semifinals, third place)
  Lucy Shuker (round robin)
  Kgothatso Montjane (round robin)
  Katharina Krüger (round robin)

Draw

Finals

Group A

Group B

References

External links

Women's singles draw

Masters, 2017